Machos (lit: Males)  is a Chilean television series which aired on Canal 13 from March 10, to October 23, 2003. The series was created by Sebastián Arrau, Coca Gómez, and Pablo Illanes.

Cast 
 Héctor Noguera as Ángel Mercader
 Liliana Ross as Valentina Fernández
 Cristián Campos as Alonso Mercader
 Carolina Arregui as Sonia Trujillo
 Rodrigo Bastidas as Armando Mercader
 Felipe Braun as Ariel Mercader
 Jorge Zabaleta as Álex Mercader
 Gonzalo Valenzuela as Adán Mercader
 Diego Muñoz as Amaro Mercader
 Pablo Díaz as Antonio Mercader
 María Elena Swett como Fernanda Garrido
 María José Prieto as Mónica Salazar
 Viviana Rodríguez as Consuelo Valdés
 Maricarmen Arrigorriaga as Estela Salazar
 Alejandro Castillo as Fanor Cruchaga
 Solange Lackington as Josefina Urrutia
 Adriana Vacarezza as Isabel Füller
 Íngrid Cruz as Belén Cruchaga
 Juan Pablo Bastidas as Benjamín Cruchaga
 Aranzazú Yankovic as Úrsula Villavicencio
 Renato Münster as Pedro Pablo Estévez
 Berta Lasala as Pilar Ponce
 Teresita Reyes as Imelda Robles
 Marcela Medel as Clemencia Ríos
 Mariana Loyola as Soraya Salcedo
 Sergio Silva as Lucas Farfán
 Carolina Varleta as Kiara Salazar
 Lorena Capetillo as Madona Ríos
 Sebastián Arancibia as Nicolás Ponce
 José Jiménez as Andrés "Andresito" Mercader
 Elvira López as Alicia Mercader Robles
 Nelly Meruane as Mirna Robles
 María Elena Duvauchelle as Bernarda Bravo
 Teresa Munchmeyer as Tía Chita Reyes
 Antonella Ríos as Yolanda "Yoly" Salcedo
 Cristián Guzmán as Gustavo Heredia
 Macarena Teke as Manuela Silva
 Felipe Hurtado as Ignacio "Nacho" Ossa
 Paulina de la Paz as María José "Cachorra" González
 Leonardo Álvarez as Diego Bernales
 Constanza González as Cristina
 Rosa Ramírez as Jacinta Montero
 Fernando Gómez-Rovira as René Sandoval
 Emilio García as Sammy

Special participations 
 Catherine Mazoyer as Paula Jiménez (Álex's lawyer)
 Alejandro Trejo as Víctor Benavides
 Pedro Vicuña as Carlos Garrido
 Coca Rudolphy as Ema Salinas de Garrido
 Remigio Remedy as Raimundo Fernández
 Pamela Villalba as Tatiana Romero
 Óscar Garcés as Kevin "Chino" Heredia
 Sebastián Dahm as Javier Coccolo
 Rubén Darío Guevara as Joaquín Fernández
 Francisca Márquez as Clarita Manríquez
 Arturo Ruiz-Tagle as Mauro Salcedo
 Patricia Irribarra as Tía Nena, mother of Soraya
 Sergio Gajardo as Soraya's father
 Clara Brevis as Soraya's grandmother
 Nicolás Fontaine as Julián Pérez
 Reinaldo Vallejos as AGD&T Investor
 Víctor Rojas as Uncle Washington Salcedo
 Gabriel Maturana as Dr. Max Hernández
 Sergio Madrid as Valentina's doctor
 Osvaldo Lagos as Uncle Sebastián
 Cecilia Hidalgo as Lourdes
 Humberto Gallardo as Sacerdote
 Cristián Gajardo as Cholo Salcedo
 Néstor Castagno as college director
 Teresa Berríos as Rosita, friend of Chita
 Hugo Vásquez as Patricio
 Yamén Salazar as Andrés and Nicolás' professor
 Macarena Basterrica as Bernarda's secretary
 Carlos Araya as Josefina's chief
 Magdalena Ahumada as Evelyn Urquieta

References

External links 
 

2003 telenovelas
Chilean telenovelas
Canal 13 (Chilean TV channel) telenovelas
2003 Chilean television series debuts
2003 Chilean television series endings
Spanish-language telenovelas